Huntington is the name of four places in the State of Georgia:

Huntington, Bulloch County, Georgia
Huntington, Richmond County, Georgia
Huntington, Sumter County, Georgia
Huntington, Troup County, Georgia